State Highway 44 (SH 44) is a Texas state highway that runs from west of Encinal to Corpus Christi, Texas. This highway is also known as the Cesar Chavez Memorial Highway outside the city limits of Robstown, Banquete, Agua Dulce, Alice, and Corpus Christi in Nueces and Jim Hogg counties.

History
 SH 44 was originally proposed on April 24, 1919 as a connector route between Waco and Giddings. On July 16, 1923, the southern terminus extended south to LaGrange. By 1926, construction was continuing on the highway, and SH 44 was concurrent with U.S. Highway 77 (US 77). On July 15, 1935, SH 21 was rerouted concurrent with SH 44 from north of Giddings to Giddings. On November 24, 1936, this route had extended south to Hallettsville and another section from Victoria south via Sinton and Robstown to Alice was designated, creating a gap and replacing part of SH 72 and all of SH 128 (which was reassigned to the portion of SH 72 that was disconnected due to SH 44). On April 19, 1938, the section of SH 44 from SH 21 north of Giddings to Giddings was no longer concurrent with SH 21, because SH 21 was rerouted west of Lincoln. On July 15, 1938, the section from Hallettsville to Victoria (already under construction as a lateral road) was added, closing the gap. On September 26, 1939, the section north of Hallettsville was already part of US 77, the section from there to Victoria was changed to SH 295, the section from Victoria to Sinton was already part of US 77, and the section from Sinton to Robstown was reassigned as an extension of SH 96. The eastern terminus was shifted to Corpus Christi over part of SH 16. The western terminus was then extended to Freer on July 1, 1940.

On November 21, 1917, an intercounty highway was designated from Taylor to Hearne. A spur, SH 44A, was designated on July 20, 1920 along part of the intercounty highway from Taylor to Milano. On January 17, 1921, SH 44A became part of an extended SH 43A.

 From 1948 to 1953, FM 863 went from Beaver Creek to the town of Hilda which became RM 648 and is now RM 783. FM 863 was designated over a new route and part of FM 133 from Encinal to Freer in 1953. Before 1955, FM 863 ended at the Webb–LaSalle county Line. On January 22, 1958, FM 863 began to be signed, but not designated, as SH 44. On August 29, 1990, FM 863 was officially designated as SH 44, and FM 863 was cancelled.

Possible future

A bill has been submitted by House Representative Blake Farenthold to Congress to approve turning SH 44 into an Interstate Highway. The bill is called H.R. 4523 or 44 to 69 Act of 2014. The plans are to turn SH 44 into an interstate highway between Freer (where it will intersect I-69W) and Corpus Christi, Texas (about ) in order to have a network of interstate highways connecting Laredo (the largest inland port on the United States–Mexican border) with Corpus Christi (a major seaport and manufacturing center). In Corpus Christi, SH 44 is already at interstate highway standard and it is a four-lane divided highway westward to the city of San Diego, Texas. The  from San Diego to Freer is a two-lane section.

Business routes
SH 44 has two business routes.

Robstown business loop

Business State Highway 44-C (formerly Loop 296) is a business loop that runs on the former routing of SH 44 through Robstown. The road was bypassed on January 19, 1956 by SH 44 and designated Loop 296. Loop 296 was designated as Business SH 44-C on June 21, 1990. On July 31, 2003 the road was rerouted on a new route to US 77 and the original section was returned to local jurisdiction.

Corpus Christi bypass
Business State Highway 44-D is a bypass of SH 44 in Corpus Christi. The route was created in 2006.

Former Corpus Christi business loop

Business State Highway 44-D (formerly Loop 443) was a business loop that ran on the former routing of SH 44 through Corpus Christi. The road was bypassed on October 3, 1966 by SH 44 and designated Loop 443. Loop 443 was designated as Business SH 44-D on June 21, 1990, but much of the route was redesignated as Spur 544 on June 18, 1996 and a small section was returned to local jurisdiction.

Major intersections

Notes

References

044
Alice, Texas
Transportation in Webb County, Texas
Transportation in Duval County, Texas
Transportation in Jim Wells County, Texas
Transportation in La Salle County, Texas
Transportation in Nueces County, Texas